AN/UYQ-70 (Q-70) is the specification for a family of United States Navy display workstations. 

Starting in 1991, it replaced the AN/UYQ-21 (series) displays and various submarine combat system displays: AN/BQQ-5(V) Control Display Console (CDC), Improved Control Display Console (ICDC), Mk 81 Mod(v) Combat Control System control and display consoles and various navigation and imaging display equipment.

Components
The Q-70 supports the Intel x86, PowerPC, SPARC, and HP PA-RISC processing families as well as commercial operating systems including Solaris, Windows NT, HP-UX and VxWorks. 

The family architecture is based on a single-board 6U VME RISC processor, currently the 165 MHz Hewlett Packard HP744. This has up to 512 Mio (1 Gio in two slot units) of dual-ported, error-correcting RAM with HP-UX for non real-time operations, or HP-RT operating systems for real-time operations. 

There are two graphics engine options available. Esterline offers 30 million vectors/s up to 2,048 × 2,048 resolution with 12 underlay and 12 overlay planes. The HP Graphics option provides 31 million pixels/s up to 1,280 × 1,024 resolution and eight underlay and eight overlay planes. The video frame grabber has a 30 Hz frame rate with up to two windows managed by the X Window System using the Motif GUI. 

Originally the ADS used CMS-2 language software. This was later supplemented by, or replaced with, C and Ada.

References

Military computers
Equipment of the United States Navy
Military electronics of the United States